The 2017 Utah State Aggies volleyball team will  represent Utah State University in the 2017 NCAA Division I women's volleyball season. The Aggies are led by twelfth year head coach Grayson DuBose and play their home games at the Wayne Estes Center. The Aggies are members of the Mountain West.

Utah State comes off a season where they finished 8–10 in conference, 14–16 overall, good for seventh in the conference. Coming into 2017 the Aggies were picked to finish sixth in the pre-season Mountain West poll.

Season highlights
Season highlights will be filled in as the season progresses.

Roster

Schedule

 *-Indicates Conference Opponent
 y-Indicates NCAA Playoffs
 Times listed are Mountain Time Zone.

Announcers for televised games
All home games will be on the MW Network powered by Stadium. Select road games will also be televised or streamed.

Arkansas: Brett Dolan & Caitlin Donahoe
Pacific: Daniel Hansen & Meagan Nelson
Montana State: Daniel Hansen & Meagan Nelson
UC Santa Barbara: Braden Clark & Trevor Porath
Utah Valley: Daniel Hansen & Meagan Nelson
Northern Arizona: Zach Lorhap?
Weber State: Kylee Young
Southern Utah: Bryson Lester
San Diego State: Braden Clark & Trevor Porath
Fresno State: Daniel Hansen & Meagan Nelson
UNLV: Wyatt Tomchek & Elli Woinowsky
New Mexico: Adam Diehl
Wyoming: Daniel Hansen & Meagan Nelson
Colorado State: Braden Clark & Trevor Porath
Boise State: Braden Clark & Jaden Johnson
Fresno State: Stephen Trembley
San Diego State: Chris Ello
New Mexico: 
UNLV: 
Colorado State:
Wyoming: 
Boise State: 
Air Force:
Nevada: 
San Jose State:

References

2017 team
2017 in sports in Utah
Utah State